Brandon Jeffrey Ward (born November 4, 1981) is a former American football safety. He was signed by the Baltimore Ravens as an undrafted free agent in 2005. He played college football at Florida State.

Ward has also played for the Oakland Raiders and Las Vegas Locomotives.

Professional career

Las Vegas Locomotives
Ward was signed by the Las Vegas Locomotives of the United Football League on August 31, 2009.

References

External links
Florida State Seminoles bio

1981 births
Living people
Players of American football from Dallas
American football safeties
Florida State Seminoles football players
Baltimore Ravens players
Oakland Raiders players
Las Vegas Locomotives players